Jean Marie Bosser (23 December 1922 – 6 December 2013), sometimes listed as Jean-Michel Bosser was a French botanist and agricultural engineer who worked extensively in Madagascar and Mauritius.

Bosser was a researcher at the Laboratoire de Phanérogamie at the Muséum national d'histoire naturelle in Paris. From 1962 to 1963 he was the director of ORSTOM (Office de la recherche scientifique et technique outre-mer, now Institut de recherche pour le développement) in Antananarivo, Madagascar. Together with Thérésien Cadet and Joseph Guého he contributed to the series Flore des Mascareignes published by the Institut de recherche pour le développement (IRD), the Mauritius Sugar Industry Research Institute (MSIRI), and the Royal Botanic Gardens, Kew since 1976 and is a comprehensive work on the flora of Mauritius, Réunion, and Rodrigues. Bosser described numerous new species from Madagascar and the Mascarenes, such as Bulbophyllum labatii, Cynanchum staubii and Cynanchum guehoi. As of June 2014 the International Plant Names Index (IPNI) lists 318 taxa (including many orchids) described by Bosser either as sole author or as a co-author.

Publications (selected) 
 2000. Contribution à l'étude des Orchidaceae de Madagascar et des Mascareignes. XXIX. Révision de la section Kainochilus du genre Bulbophyllum. Adansonia 22(2) 167–182  pdf online
 2000. Bosser JM; D Florens. Syzygium guehoi ( Myrtaceae ), nouvelle espèce de l'île Maurice. Adansonia 22(2) 183–186  pdf online
 2001. Bosser JM; P Cribb. Trois nouvelles espèces de Bulbophyllum ( Orchidaceae ) de Madagascar. Adansonia 23(1) 129–135  pdf online
 2002. Bosser JM. Contribution à l'étude des Orchidaceae de Madagascar, des Comores et des Mascareignes. XXXII. Un Cynorkis nouveau des Comores et un Eulophia nouveau de La Réunion. Adansonia 24(1) 21–25  pdf online
 2002. la Croix, I; JM Bosser; PJ Cribb. The genus Disperis ( Orchidaceae ) in Madagascar, the Comores, the Mascarenes & the Seychelles . Adansonia 24(1) 55–87 pdf online
 2002. Bosser JM. Une nouvelle espèce de Turraea ( Meliaceae ) des Mascareignes. Localisation de T. thouarsiana et identité de T. casimiriana . Adansonia 24(1) 113–116  pdf online
 2002. Bosser JM; J Guého. Deux nouvelles espèces de Pandanus ( Pandanaceae ) de l'île Maurice. Adansonia 24(2) 239–242  pdf online[
 2003. Bosser JM; PJ Cribb. Contribution à l'étude des Orchidaceae de Madagascar, des Comores et des Mascareignes. XXXIV. Bathiorchis , nouveau genre monotypique de Madagascar. Adansonia 25(2) 229–231   pdf online
 2004. Bosser, JM. Contribution à l'étude des Orchidaceae de Madagascar, des Comores et des Mascareignes. XXXIII Adansonia 26(1) 53–61  pdf online
 2005. Bosser, JM; R Rabevohitra. Espèces nouvelles dans le genre Dalbergia (Fabaceae, Papilionoideae) à Madagascar. Adansonia 27(2) 209–216  pdf online
 2006. Bosser, JM. Contribution à l'étude des Orchidaceae de Madagascar, des Comores et des Mascareignes. XXXV. Description d'un Oeceoclades nouveau de Madagascar, et notes sur trois genres nouveaux pour les Mascareignes. Adansonia 28(1) 45–54 pdf online
 2012. Baider, C; FBV Florens; F Rakotoarivelo; J Bosser; T. Pailler. Two new records of Jumellea (Orchidaceae) for Mauritius (Mascarene Islands) and its conservation status. Phytotaxa 52: 21–28 abstract online

Books 
 2007. Hermans, J; C Hermans; D Du Puy; P Cribb; JM Bosser. Orchids of Madagascar. Ed. Royal Botanic Kew 398 pp.

Dedicated species 

 (Acanthaceae) Anisostachya bosseri Benoist
 (Aizoaceae) Delosperma bosserianum Marais
 (Asphodelaceae) Aloe bosseri J.-B.Castillon
 (Arecaceae) Dypsis bosseri J.Dransf. (long known only by the holotype collected by Bosser in December 1962 until its rediscovery in 1999)
 (Asclepiadaceae) Ceropegia bosseri Rauh & Buchloh
 (Asclepiadaceae) Secamone bosseri Klack.
 (Begoniaceae) Begonia bosseri Keraudren
 (Boraginaceae) Hilsenbergia bosseri J.S.Mill.
 (Cucurbitaceae) Ampelosicyos bosseri (Keraudren) H.Schaef. & S.S.Renner
 (Cyperaceae) Trichoschoenus bosseri J.Raynal
 (Dioscoreaceae) Dioscorea bosseri Haigh & Wilkin
 (Ericaceae) Erica bosseri Dorr
 (Eriocaulaceae) Paepalanthus bosseri (Morat) T.Stützel
 (Euphorbiaceae) Euphorbia bosseri Leandri
 (Lamiaceae) Clerodendrum bosseri Capuron
 (Lamiaceae) Plectranthus bosseri Hedge
 (Leguminosae) Crotalaria bosseri M.Peltier
 (Leguminosae) Indigofera bosseri Du Puy & Labat
 (Menyanthaceae) Nymphoides bosseri A.Raynal
 (Monimiaceae) Tambourissa bosseri Jérémie & Lorence
 (Montiniaceae) Grevea bosseri Letouzey
 (Myrtaceae) Eugenia bosseri J.Guého & A.J.Scott
 (Orchidaceae) Angraecum bosseri Senghas
 (Orchidaceae) Bilabrella bosseriana (Szlach. & Olszewski) Szlach. & Kras-Lap.
 (Orchidaceae) Bulbophyllum bosseri K.Lemcke
 (Orchidaceae) Disperis bosseri la Croix & P.J.Cribb
 (Orchidaceae) Jumellea bosseri Pailler
 (Portulacaceae) Talinella bosseri Appleq.
 (Pteridaceae) Pteris bosseri (Tardieu) Christenh.
 (Rubiaceae) Canthium bosseri Cavaco
 (Rubiaceae) Chassalia bosseri Verdc.
 (Rubiaceae) Peponidium bosseri (Cavaco) Razafim., Lantz & B.Bremer
 (Sterculiaceae) Acropogon bosseri Morat & Chalopin
 (Vitaceae) Cissus bosseri Desc.

References 

Mauritian scientists
20th-century French botanists
1922 births
2013 deaths
Agrostologists